Xuxa só para Baixinhos 1 (also known as XSPB 1) is the twenty - third studio album and the seventeenth in Portuguese by singer and Brazilian presenter Xuxa, is the debut album of the Só Para Baixinhos collection, was released by Som Livre on October 5, 2000.

Background
With Sasha's , birth, Xuxa's perception of the little ones' Brazilian music market was sharpened. There were almost no products and what was there was not well done. Watching her daughter dancing in front of the TV while watching one of the countless music video tapes she had bought on trips abroad, Xuxa was sure that this was what Brazil lacked: educational music. Not that the presenter had "uneducated" any child with her previous works; on the contrary, Xuxa always worried about leaving good messages in his work. The way to communicate is that it must be different, the way to reach the little ones and that's where the visual part comes in.

Content
Xuxa só para Baixinhos music videos, except Butterfly, were inspired by American videos (Barney) to Australians (The Wiggles). If we look for any of the tracks by the original name we will see that the design of the videos is the same: from the movements to the camera positioning and scenery. It was not time to take a risk, it was the first attack in this niche and wanting to change what was already accurate would be to jeopardize the success of the project, which for years already worked well outside Brazil. The evolution of the project with the language of Xuxa has been happening naturally and gradually over the next editions.

Release and reception
Xuxa só para Baixinhos 1, it was released on Octubre 5, 2000, first in the CD and VHS version and in DVD in the beginning of 2001, it was re-released in the CD and VHS version in 2002, it was remastered and released on independent CD in 2008 in economic version. The most famous songs on the album are "Cinco Patinhos", "Batatinha Bem Quentinha" and "Cabeça, Ombro, Joelho e pé".

The album sold 50,000 copies in DVD and 250,000 in CD yielding two disks of gold and platinum respectively. The song "A Borboleta" was dedicated to his goddaughter who died in December 1997, a victim of meningitis at the age of four.

Track listing

Personnel
Art Direction: Aramis Barros
Art Coordination: Marlene Mattos e Xuxa Meneghel
Production: Zé Henrique
Recording Engineer: Everson Dias, Val Martins, Marcelão e Sergio Knust
Recording Assistants: Wellington (Garoto) e Paulinho Baldes
Masterização: Sergio Seabra
Recorded in studios:  Yahoo
Mixing Technicians: Jorge "Gordo" Guimarães
Arrangements: Yahoo
Recording Assistant: Claudio Oliveira

Certifications

References

External links 
 Xuxa só para Baixinhos 1 at Discogs

2000 albums
2000 video albums
Xuxa video albums
Xuxa albums
Children's music albums by Brazilian artists
Portuguese-language video albums
Portuguese-language albums
Som Livre albums